Innovation management measurement helps companies in understanding the current status of their innovation capabilities and practices. Throughout this control areas of strength and weakness are identified and the organizations get a clue where they have to concentrate on to maximize the future success of their innovation procedures. Furthermore, the measurement of innovation assists firms in fostering an innovation culture within the organization and in spreading the awareness of the importance of innovation. It also discloses the restrictions for creativity and opportunity for innovation. Because of all these arguments it is very important to measure the degree of innovation in the company, also in comparison with other companies. On the other hand, firms have to be careful not to misapply the wrong metrics, because they could threaten innovation and influence thinking in the wrong way.

Historical Development of Innovation Metrics 
Innovation has been viewed as an activity on the micro-level for a long time. It was concentrated on individual inventors and firms and therefore, on the related products and production systems. However, in the past few years, there has been a development towards a macro-level view concerning innovation measurement. For example, in the European Union the innovation capabilities of the different countries are measured on the basis of objective economic numbers. There has also been a development from a one-dimensional view of innovation to a multi-dimensional view that considers other innovation indicators such as the different meaning of innovation in service sectors, the innovators’ dependence on the global competitive market and the socio-economic and institutional environment. Generally we can classify the progress of innovation metrics and the related indicators into four generations. The first generation (1950s-60s) focused on input indicators like R&D expenditures and capital. The following generation (1970s-80s) had its core area in the measurement of output indicators such as patents, products and publications. In the third generation (1990s) came along specific innovation indicators like innovation surveys and benchmarking and since the beginning of the new millennium process indicators such as networks, system dynamics and intangibles have played a major role in the diverse metrics.

Innovation Metrics

Diamond model 

The Diamond Model is a measurement framework that considers five dimensions for the assessment of the degree of innovation: Strategy, process, organization, linkages and learning. In the assessment of the strategy three areas are being tested. First the model needs to know, whether the company has a well-managed strategic planning process in place, afterwards, whether innovation is incorporated within the entire corporate strategy and ultimately, whether the company has put in place mechanisms that assist the implementation of the corporate strategy. The assessment of the process area considers the robustness and flexibility of the organization's new product development process and the organization's ability to manage its internal processes. In the third area organization is being analyzed, if the structure of the organization allows innovation processes and if the management encourages employees to create and develop new ideas. Concerning the linkages area the model examines the firm's networking ability and the last major area of the Diamond Model explores the organization's commitment and ability to learn from its successes and failures and the willingness to train and develop its employees and to spread these learning to the entire organization. The more distinctive these five areas are as a combination the more innovative is a company.

Innovation Funnel 
The Innovation Funnel Framework consists of nine stages in an innovation process. These nine single elements that are part of three major steps form an end to end innovation process. The first major step contains the input factors of the innovation process. In this model they are described as strategic thinking and portfolio management and metrics. The second step is the main part of the process with the single stages research, ideation, insight, targeting, innovation development and market development. In the final step the output of the process is analyzed through the selling numbers. The model suggests a feedback loop from the output step back to the input step as a learning loop to improve future results.

Innovation Value Chain – IVC 
The Innovation Value Chain is a measurement framework developed by Hansen and Bikinshaw and presents innovation as a three-phase process that involves idea generation, idea conversion and idea diffusion. The idea generation can take place in-house or can also come from external influences. In the conversion phase the innovation is selected and built and in the diffusion phase it is spread and commercialized. The Innovation Value Chain is easy to scale and can therefore be used for inter-sectoral comparisons. Roper et al. (2008) extended this model by rebuilding the three phases into the three innovation activities accessing knowledge, building innovation and commercializing innovation.

Oslo Manual Innovation Measurement Framework 
To compare innovation data in an internationally comparable way the OSLO Manual Innovation Measurement Framework is very useful, since it considers approaches that view innovation as a whole system of different theories of innovation based on diverse firms. The model examines the degree of innovation in a single firm, the linkages with other firms and public research institutions, the institutional framework in which firms operate and last but not least role of demand in the specific industry. All these areas combined build a measurement tool to compare the firms with each other.

Innovation Audit Tools

InnoCERT 
InnoCERT is a tool developed in Malaysia with the aim to test innovative companies through a standardized compliance process. The firms get a certification if they are rated as an innovative organization after a process of online self-assessment and verification and evaluation of the four basic dimensions innovation ability, commercialization ability, innovation management ability and innovation result.

Inno-Biz assessment 
The Inno-Biz assessment is a two-phase Korean Model based on the OSLO Manual. The first phase consists of an online self-diagnosis with an assessment of the technology innovation system of a firm containing four fields: technology innovation capability, technology commercialization capability, technology innovation management capability and technology innovation achievements. The second phase concentrates on the four fields management owner's technical capability, technological viability, marketability as well as business viability and profitability and is an on-site assessment of a technology guarantee fund that hands out  a rating based on a 10-grade system from AAA to D.

NESTA (National Endowment for Science, Technology and the Arts) 
NESTA is the National Endowment for Science Technology and the Arts in the UK with the goal to test and transform UK's capacity for innovation. Therefore, it has launched the “innovation index project” in 2008 to analyze the innovation capability of each sector. It aims to develop a framework to compare innovation capability between sectors to establish an adequate policy and strategy. Like in the Innovation Value Chain Model the process consists of the three phases assessing knowledge, building innovation and commercializing innovation.

IMP³rove – Europe Innova 
The European Commission created this tool to improve the Innovation Management Performance of small- and medium-sized enterprises in Europe. It is based on all dimensions of the “A.T. Kearney House of Innovation” and measures the performance of the key factors for successful Innovation Management. These are innovation strategy, innovation organization and culture, innovation lifecycle processes, enabling factors and innovation results. The tool is divided into four steps. In the first step the SMEs go through an online assessment. Afterwards a benchmarking report is developed before the companies get a consulting workshop on innovation that should lead to a continuous improvement.

Innovation Radar 
The Innovation Radar is a tool based on research into the innovation habits of Fortune 500 companies. It observes four main dimensions, which are, first of all, the offerings a company creates (WHAT), secondly the customers it serves (WHO), furthermore the processes it employs (HOW) and finally the points of presence it uses to take its offerings to market (WHERE). This tool takes a business model perspective on innovation based on the belief that this perspective is more useful than the focus only on product or process innovation.

Selecting the right Innovativeness Measure 
Generally, an innovation measurement tool should precisely measure what matters according to the current phase of innovation in a particular industry or company. Therefore, it has to fulfill the following points: First of all, it has to generate value for the company. Another important issue is the focus on the innovation process capability to ensure the performance sustainability. Additionally, it should provide decision makers with information about the barriers of innovation within the organization and it should help to make better decisions. A measurement tool has to be as simple and effective as possible and the results have to be confidential and should be comparable to enable benchmarking. So, selecting the appropriate innovativeness measure depends on different factors that vary across firms, industries, countries and cultures.

References 

Economic stimulus programs
Innovation